Patrick B. Gillespie Sr. (November 23, 1945 – August 29, 2022) was an American politician who served as a Democratic member of the Pennsylvania House of Representatives for the 162nd district from 1975 to 1976.

Early life and education
Gillespie was born in Philadelphia, Pennsylvania.  He graduated from St. Thomas More High School in 1963 and attended St. Joseph College of Industrial Relations.

Career
He was elected to the Pennsylvania House of Representatives for the 162nd district and served from 1975 to 1976.

References

1945 births
2022 deaths
Democratic Party members of the Pennsylvania House of Representatives
2008 United States presidential electors
Politicians from Philadelphia